Leyte's at-large congressional district was the provincewide electoral district for Philippine national legislatures in both the undivided province of Leyte before its 1959 division and the northern three-fourths that retained its name from 1984 to 1986.

Leyte first elected its representatives at-large in the 1943 Philippine legislative election for a seat in the National Assembly of the Second Philippine Republic. Before 1943, the undivided island province which also included Biliran was represented in the national legislatures through its first, second, third, fourth and fifth districts. The undivided province was also earlier represented in the Malolos Congress of the First Philippine Republic in 1898 by appointed delegates from Luzon.

The five districts were restored in Leyte ahead of the 1941 Philippine House of Representatives elections whose elected representatives only began to serve following the dissolution of the Second Republic and the restoration of the Philippine Commonwealth in 1945. An at-large district would not be used in the province until the 1984 Philippine parliamentary election for five seats in the Batasang Pambansa, with a separate representation created for Southern Leyte which it had been entitled to since the 1959 division. It became obsolete following the 1987 reapportionment under a new constitution that restored the five districts in Leyte.

Representation history

See also
Legislative districts of Leyte

References

Former congressional districts of the Philippines
Politics of Leyte (province)
1898 establishments in the Philippines
1901 disestablishments in the Philippines
1943 establishments in the Philippines
1944 disestablishments in the Philippines
1984 establishments in the Philippines
1986 disestablishments in the Philippines
At-large congressional districts of the Philippines
Congressional districts of Eastern Visayas
Constituencies established in 1898
Constituencies disestablished in 1901
Constituencies established in 1943
Constituencies disestablished in 1944
Constituencies established in 1984
Constituencies disestablished in 1986